Lalo is the surname of:

 Bhai Lalo (1452–?), a person in Sikh history in Pakistan
 Charles Lalo (1877–1953), French writer
 Édouard Lalo (1823–1892), French composer
 Eyal Lalo, president and CEO of Invicta Watch Group
 Pierre Lalo (1866–1943), French music critic and translator
 Tamar Lalo (born 1984), Israeli recorder player

See also